Château de Wœrth is a castle in the commune of Wœrth, in the department of Bas-Rhin, Alsace, France. It currently houses the mairie and a museum. It is a listed historical monument since 2002.

References

Castles in Bas-Rhin
Monuments historiques of Bas-Rhin